Lorca van de Putte (born 3 April 1988) is a Belgian football defender currently playing for Bristol City W.F.C. in FA Women's Super League. She previously played in the Dutch Eredivisie for FC Twente, with which she also played the UEFA Champions League. She is a member of the Belgian national team.

References

External links
 
 Belgium national profile  at KBVB / URBSFA
 
  
 

1988 births
People from Lokeren
Living people
Belgian women's footballers
Belgian expatriate women's footballers
Belgian expatriate sportspeople in England
Expatriate women's footballers in England
Expatriate women's footballers in the Netherlands
Belgian expatriate sportspeople in the Netherlands
Eredivisie (women) players
Expatriate women's footballers in Sweden
Damallsvenskan players
Kristianstads DFF players
Belgium women's international footballers
FC Twente (women) players
Women's association football defenders
Women's Super League players
Bristol City W.F.C. players
RSC Anderlecht (women) players
WB Sinaai Girls players
Belgian expatriate sportspeople in Sweden
Footballers from East Flanders
UEFA Women's Euro 2017 players